This is a list of Dassault Mirage IIIs, Dassault Mirage 5s, and Mirage 50s used by national air forces. The Central Intelligence Agency once estimated that a little over 800 of the three aircraft types had been exported to various countries around the world.

The key "1S" indicates a single-seat Mirage fighter, while "2S" indicates a two-seat Mirage, and "PR" indicates a photo reconnaissance aircraft.

Operators

Abu Dhabi and the UAE 

Abu Dhabi Defence Force
United Arab Emirates Air Force
 1S: 12 5AD + 14 5EAD
 2S:  3 5DAD
 PR:  3 RAD

Out of Service. All of the remaining aircraft (7 5AD, 9 5EAD, 2 5DAD, and 1 5RAD) were sold to Egypt in 2004.

Argentina

Argentine Air Force
 1S: 19 IIICJ + 17 IIIEA
 2S:  3 IIIBJ +  4 IIIDA
 Plus 35 IAI 1S Dagger A + 4 2S Dagger T. Survivors locally updated to Finger standards.
 Plus 10 5P. Survivors (9) locally updated to Mara standards.
 IIICJs & IIIBJs were ex-Israeli, 5Ps were ex-Peruvian. All were retired in December 2015.

Australia

Royal Australian Air Force
116 Mirage IIIs (RAAF serials A3-1 to -116) were in service with the RAAF from 1964 to 1989.
 No. 3 Squadron RAAF, 1967-1986
 No. 75 Squadron RAAF, 1965-1988
 No. 76 Squadron RAAF, 1966-1973
 No. 77 Squadron RAAF, 1969-1987
 No. 79 Squadron RAAF, 1969-1988
 No. 2 Operational Conversion Unit RAAF, 1964-1985
 Aircraft Research and Development Unit, 1964-1989
 1S: 49 IIIO(F) + 51 IIIO(A)
 2S: 16 IIID

Most built locally, 50 sold to Pakistan in 1990, together with additional engines and spare parts.

Belgium
Belgian Air Force
 1st Squadron, 1971-1988
 2nd Squadron, 1970-1988
 42nd Squadron, 1971-1993

All but three of the aircraft were built locally under license. A minor "MIRSIP" upgrade was performed on 20 survivors in the early 1990s, but all were then retired. 25 aircraft, including all of the upgraded ones, were transferred to Chile as Elkans in 1995-1996.

Total number of aircraft delivered:
 1S: 63 5BA
 2S: 16 5BD
 PR: 27 5BR

Brazil

Brazilian Air Force
 1S: 22 IIIEBR (16 new-build and 6 second-hand French Mirage IIIEs)
 2S:  6 IIIDBR (4 new-build and 2 second-hand French Mirage IIIRs rebuilt as twin-seat aircraft) + 4 IIIBBR (2 second-hand French Mirage IIIBEs and 2 second-hand Zairian Mirage 5DMs)

Survivors upgraded with canards starting in the late 1980s. Last one retired in 2005.

Chile

Chilean Air Force
 1S: 6 50C + 8 50FC + 15 5MA "Elkan"
 2S: 3 50DC + 5 5MD "Elkan" + 1 non-modernized ex-Belgian Air Force 5BD
 PR: 4 non-modernized ex-Belgian Air Force 5BR

50FC were upgraded by Dassault from French Air Force 5Fs. All of the surviving Mirage 50s were updated by Enaer to Pantera standard from 1988 to 2002.
Elkans are modernized ex-Belgian Air Force Mirage 5s.
Some ex-South African Cheetahs as spares.
Retired on 31 December 2007

Colombia
Colombian Air Force
 1S: 14 5COA. Survivors converted to 5COAM
 2S: 2 5COD. Survivors converted to 5CODM
 PR: 2 5COR. Survivor converted to 5COAM

Starting in the late 1980s, surviving Colombian Mirages were upgraded to an improved standard, with new avionics similar to those found on the Kfir, as well as canards and an in-flight refueling probe. The upgraded aircraft were designated Mirage 5COAM/CODM.
All were retired in 2009.

Ecuador
Ecuadorian Air Force
 1S: 4 50V
 2S: 2 50DV

Egypt

Egyptian Air Force
 1S: 54 5SDE + 16 5E2 + 7 5AD + 9 5EAD
 2S: 6 5SDD
 PR: 6 5SDR + 1 5RAD
 4 ex-Spanish Air Force IIIDE and 4 ex-Zairian 5M bought for spares in 2006.

France

French Air Force
 1S: 95 IIIC + 183 IIIE  + 58 5F
 2S: 27 IIIB +   5 IIIB1 + 10 IIIB2 + 20 IIIBE
 PR: 50 IIIR +  20 IIIRD
All aircraft retired.

Gabon
Gabon Air Force
 1S: 3 5G + 4 5G2 (including 2 undelivered Zairian 5Ms)
 2S: 2 5DG + 2 5DG2

Retired around 2006-2008, although all flying activity had already been stopped in the mid-1990s.

Israel

Israeli Air Force
 101 Squadron
 117 Squadron
 119 Squadron
 253 Squadron
 254 Squadron
 113 Squadron (Nesher only)
 144 Squadron (Nesher only)

 1S: 72 IIICJ
 2S: 4 IIIBJ
 2 Mirage IIIRJ photo reconnaissance aircraft
 IAI assembled 60 Neshers, with 50 single-seaters and 10 two-seat Nesher Ts.

All of the aircraft are withdrawn from use. 39 Neshers, including 4 two-seaters, were transferred to Argentina between 1978 and the beginning of 1982. 19 IIICJ and 3 IIIBJ followed, between December 1982 and February 1983.

Lebanon
Lebanese Air Force
 1S: 10 IIIEL
 2S: 2 IIIBL

All surviving aircraft (9 IIIEL and 1 IIIBL) were sold to Pakistan in 2000.

Libya
Libyan Air Force
 1S: 53 5D + 32 5DE
 2S: 15 5DD
 PR: 10 5DR

Most of the surviving aircraft (32 5D, 29 5DE, 12 5DD and 6 5DR) were sold to Pakistan as part of Project ROSE in 2004-2005.

Pakistan

 

Pakistan Air Force
 No. 5 Squadron
 No. 7 Squadron
 No. 8 Squadron
 No. 15 Squadron
 No. 22 Squadron
 No. 25 Squadron
 No. 27 Squadron
 Combat Commanders' School

The Pakistan Air Force is the largest operator of the Dassault Mirage III/5 with a fleet strength of around 156 aircraft. The fleet consists of fighters built for Pakistan (Mirage IIIEP, IIIRP, IIIDP, IIIRP2, 5PA, 5PA2, 5PA3, 5DPA2) in the 1960s, 70s and 80s, as well as used French, Australian, Libyan, Spanish and Lebanese aircraft bought in the 1990s and early 2000s. Some 35 of the Australian-built Mirage IIIO variant were modernized with new avionics under the first stage of the ROSE (Retrofit Of Strike Element) upgrade programme to make air superiority specialized "ROSE I" fighters.

Total number of aircraft delivered:
 1S: 18 IIIEP + 28 5PA + 18 5PA2 + 12 5PA3 + 43 IIIO + 15 IIIEE + 35 5F + 32 5D + 29 5DE
 2S: 5 IIIDP + 2 5DPA2 + 7 IIID + 9 IIIBE + 5 IIIDE + 1 IIIEL + 12 5DD
 PR: 3 IIIRP + 10 IIIRP2 + 6 5DR

Note that some of the second-hand aircraft never flew with the PAF, being used only for spare parts or as training aids. Pakistan is capable of locally refurbishing its Mirages at the Mirage Rebuild Factory of the Pakistan Aeronautical Complex.

All Mirage III/Mirage 5 aircraft are to be retired and replaced with the Pakistan/China produced JF-17 by 2025.

Peru
Peruvian Air Force
 1S: 22 5P + 10 5P3 + 2 5P4
 2S: 4 5DP + 1 5DP3 + 1 5DP4

10 5P were transferred to Argentina in 1982. All of the 15 surviving aircraft were upgraded to Mirage 5P4/5DP4 standards from 1985 to 1990.
Survivors stored by 2002.

South Africa

South African Air Force
 2 Squadron SAAF, 1963-1990
 3 Squadron SAAF, 1966-1975
 85 Combat Flying School SAAF, 1974-1992 (renamed 89 Combat Flying School in 1986)
 1S: 16 IIICZ + 17 IIIEZ
 2S:  3 IIIBZ +  3 IIIDZ + 11 IIID2Z
 PR:  4 IIIRZ +  4 IIIR2Z

All out of service, some having been upgraded to Cheetah standards. There were 16 Cheetah E conversions (all out of service), 16 Cheetah D conversions, and one Cheetah R conversion.
Some Cheetah Es were sold to Chile for use as spare parts for Panteras.

Spain

Spanish Air Force
 1S: 24 IIIEE
 2S: 7 IIIDE

Upgrade plan (head-up display, ALE-40 decoy launchers, AIM-9L/AGM-65G capability, two extra hardpoints) cancelled in 1991. Withdrawn from service in October 1992. Some survivors (15 IIIEE and 5 IIIDE) were used as part of the payment for the Mirage F1M upgrade and later sold to Pakistan.

Switzerland

Swiss Air Force
 Fliegerstaffel 3, 1992-2001
 Fliegerstaffel 4, 1992-2000
 Fliegerstaffel 10, 1968-2003
 Fliegerstaffel 16, 1967-1999
 Fliegerstaffel 17, 1967-1997

Most built locally, many upgraded with canards, optics etc. Withdrawn from service in 2003.
One Mirage IIIDS (J-2012, civilian immatriculation HB-RDF) still flies for civilian passengers.

Total number of aircraft delivered:
 1S:  1 IIICS + 36 IIIS
 2S:  3 IIIBS +  2 IIIDS
 PR: 18 IIIRS

Venezuela
Venezuelan Air Force
 1S: 7 IIIEV (2 modernized to Mirage 50EV standards) + 6 5V (2 modernized to Mirage 50EV and 1 to Mirage 50DV standards) + 9 50EV (6 new-build and 3 modified ex-Zairian Mirage 5M)
 2S: 3 5DV (1 modernized to Mirage 50DV standards) + 1 50DV (new-build)

All of the surviving Mirage III/5s were modernized into Mirage 50s. The last Mirage 50s were retired from service in November 2009. Six of them were donated to Ecuador.

Zaire
Zairean Air Force
 1S: 14 5M (only 11 delivered)
 2S: 3 5DM (former IIIBE, all delivered)

The three undelivered Mirage 5Ms were bought back by Dassault in 1979. Four more followed in 1983. Of these, one became the first Egyptian Mirage 5E2, two were transformed into Mirage 5G2s for Gabon, three were rebuilt into Mirage 50EVs for Venezuela, and one served as a source of spares at Dassault's Biarritz facility. In 1989, the six last surviving aircraft were brought back to France. Of these, two Mirage 5DMs were sold to Brazil in 1996, and four Mirage 5Ms went to Egypt in 2006.

See also

Dassault Mirage III
Dassault Mirage 5

References

Bibliography
 

1950s French fighter aircraft
Mirage III